

Events

January events
 January – The Wilmington and Raleigh Railroad is chartered in Wilmington, North Carolina.
 January 30 – Construction on the first railroad in Kentucky, linking Lexington and Frankfort, is completed.

February events
 February 25 – The Richmond, Fredericksburg and Potomac Railroad is formed to connect cities in Virginia.

March events
 March 25 – The Canterbury and Whitstable Railway in England offers season tickets from this date.

April events
 April 14 – The Long Island Rail Road is incorporated in New York.

September events

December events
 December 17 – The Dublin and Kingstown Railway, the first public railway in Ireland, opens between Westland Row, Dublin (modern-day Dublin Pearse railway station) and Kingstown (modern-day Dún Laoghaire), on the standard gauge.

Unknown date events
 The Castleton and West Stockbridge Railroad is chartered to build a railroad between Albany, New York, and the Massachusetts state line.

Births

April births
 April 1 – Jim Fisk, American financier who worked with Daniel Drew for control of the Erie Railroad (d. 1872).
 April 23 – Chauncey Depew, president of New York Central Railroad (d. 1928).

Deaths

References
 Association of American Railroads (January 2005), This Month in Railroad History – January.  Retrieved May 23, 2005.